Kanigan may refer to:

 Kanigan, Iran, a village in Iran
 Kanigan, Queensland, a locality split between the Fraser Coast Region and the Gympie Region, Queensland, Australia